Gilson Alves Bernardo  (born ) is a former Brazilian male volleyball player. He was part of the Brazil men's national volleyball team at the 1996 Summer Olympics. He played for Palmeiras S.Paolo.

Clubs
 Palmeiras S.Paolo (1994)

References

1968 births
Living people
Brazilian men's volleyball players
Place of birth missing (living people)
Volleyball players at the 1996 Summer Olympics
Olympic volleyball players of Brazil
People from Contagem
Sportspeople from Minas Gerais